Chlormethenmadinone acetate (CMMA), also known as chlorsuperlutin, is a progestin medication which was developed in Czechoslovakia in the 1960s. It has been used in combination with mestranol in birth control pills under the brand names Biogest, Sterolibrin, and Antigest B, and in veterinary medicine under the brand name Agelin. Analogues of CMMA include bromethenmadinone acetate (bromsuperlutin), which was assessed but was never marketed, and melengestrol acetate (methylsuperlutin), which is used in veterinary medicine.

See also
 List of progestogen esters § Esters of 17α-hydroxyprogesterone derivatives
 16-Methylene-17α-hydroxyprogesterone acetate

References

Abandoned drugs
Acetate esters
Chloroarenes
Diketones
Pregnanes
Progestogen esters
Progestogens
Veterinary drugs
Vinylidene compounds